Bareilly College, Bareilly (BCB) is an institution located in the metropolis of Bareilly in the Indian state of Uttar Pradesh. The college is affiliated with the M. J. P. Rohilkhand University, and has been affiliated with the Agra University and Allahabad University before the establishment of Rohilkhand University. It was established during the reign British Empire in 1837.

History
Bareilly College was established in 1837. It was initially established as a Government school under the Liberal Government of Sir Charles Metcalfe the then Lt. Governor of the North Western Provinces. Thereafter the strength of college increased. The college was soon elevated to a Government College, with 57 enrolled students and Mr. Rogers as its headmaster. In the year 1850, it was recognized as a Government Degree College with Mr. Vernon Tregear (1850–53) as its first principal. A boarding house was opened in the college in September 1860.

Campus
The Bareilly College is housed in the building donated to the college by the Nawab of Rampur and the vicinity is still known as Rampur Garden or Rampur Bagh. A new building was added to it in 1905, whose cornerstone was laid by Sir James John Digges la Touche the then lieutenant governor of the Northern Province, now known as Uttar Pradesh. He named the building Bareilly College.

It now contains an auditorium at the central vista flanked by a clock tower. The college also has a swimming pool, cafeteria, and a residential boarding house by the name Azad Hostel. Almost two centuries old, this college initially had four boarding houses converted into offices with time. Azad Hostel is the only boarding house that remains to the present day. At present it is defunct and a new building is being proposed at the place where it stands.

Courses

Graduate courses
BA

 Sociology
 Music
 Education
 Fine Arts
 Economics
 English
 Hindi
 Urdu
 Sanskrit
 Persian
 History
 Political Science
 Philosophy
 Statistics
 Military Science
 Arabic
 Geography
 Psychology
 Home Science

BSc

 Statistics
 Physics
 Mathematics
 Zoology
 Botany
 Military Science
 Biotechnology
 Environmental Science

B.Com
 Commerce

Professional courses
B.Com Honors
 Commerce
B.Ed
 Education
BBA
 Management
BCA
 Computer
B.Lib
 Library Science
LLB
 Law

Postgraduate courses
M.A.

 Mathematics
 Economics
 English
 Hindi
 Urdu
 Geography
 History
 Political Science
 Philosophy
 Sanskrit
 Sociology
 Military Science
 Fine Arts
 Statistics

M.Sc.

 Mathematics
 Physics
 Chemistry (Organic)
 Chemistry (Inorganic/Physical)
 Zoology
 Botany
 Military Science
 Statistics

M.Com.

LLM

Faculties

 Arts
 Commerce
 Computer Science
 Education
 Law
 Management
 Science
 Environmental Science
 Biotechnology

Departments
 Department of Science
 Department of Military Sciences
 Department of Geography
 Department of Music
 Department of Physical Education
 Department of Psychology
 Department of Physics
 Department of Chemistry
 Department of Biology
 Department of Biotechnology
 Department of English
 Department of Urdu
 Department of Fine Arts
 Department of Mathematics
 Department of Law
 Department of Commerce

Research
Bareilly College Bareilly awards Ph.D. degrees in Chemistry, Zoology, Botany, Mil. Studies, English, Economics, Mathematics, Urdu, Hindi, Commerce, History, Philosophy, Drawing & Painting and Sociology.

Notable alumni 
List of notable people who studied at Bareilly College, Bareilly.
 Rajesh Agarwal, MLA
 Naseem Ahmad, IAS
 Santosh Kumar Gangwar, MP
 Vinod Kapri, filmmaker
 Ajit Singh, freedom fighter, uncle of Bhagat Singh

See also 
 Government Degree College Sambhal
 Mahatma Gandhi Memorial Post Graduate College
 Hindu Degree College, Moradabad

References

External links

 Official website

Colleges in Uttar Pradesh
Educational institutions established in 1837
1837 establishments in India
Education in Bareilly